Thomas Gregory Skinner (January 22, 1842 – December 22, 1907) was a U.S. Representative from North Carolina, brother of Harry Skinner.

Life and career
Born near Hertford, North Carolina, Skinner attended private schools, Friends Academy, Belvidere, North Carolina, Horners Military School, Oxford, North Carolina, and the University of North Carolina at Chapel Hill. He entered the Confederate States Army in May 1861 and served with the First Regiment, North Carolina Volunteers, until the close of the Civil War, attaining the rank of lieutenant. He studied law, was admitted to the bar in 1868, and commenced practice in Hertford, North Carolina.

Skinner was elected as a Democrat to the Forty-eighth Congress on November 20, 1883, to fill the vacancy caused by the death of Walter F. Pool. He was reelected to the Forty-ninth Congress and served from November 20, 1883, to March 3, 1887.

Skinner was again elected to the Fifty-first Congress (March 4, 1889 – March 3, 1891) but in 1890 declined to be a candidate for renomination to the Fifty-second Congress, and resumed the practice of law in Hertford. He served as delegate to the Democratic National Convention in 1892 and 1904, and as a member of the North Carolina State Senate in 1899 and 1900. He died in Baltimore, Maryland on December 22, 1907, and was interred in Holy Trinity Churchyard, Hertford, North Carolina.

Notes

Sources

1842 births
1907 deaths
Confederate States Army officers
Democratic Party members of the United States House of Representatives from North Carolina
Democratic Party North Carolina state senators
People from Hertford, North Carolina
19th-century American politicians